Beer is the most popular industrial alcoholic beverage in Ethiopia with lager being the most consumed type of beer. In the rural sector the home-brewn talla or siwa is still dominant.

History
The first brewery in Ethiopia was established in 1922 by St. George Beer (named after the patron saint of Ethiopia). Brands like Meta and Bedele are also older brands in Ethiopia but have since been acquired by foreign companies and re-branded.

Industry
The Beer industry in Ethiopia has gone through tremendous growth in the last two decades. It transformed into one of the most competitive industries in Ethiopia with millions of birr spent on advertisements alone. The competitiveness of the industry has led to more investment the farming sector such as in malt production.

Top 15 beer brands in Ethiopia according to RateBeer.com (as of 2017)

Brands
 Meta (ሜታ ቢራ)
 Bedele (በደሌ ቢራ)
 Dashen (ዳሽን ቢራ)

 Jano (ጃኖ)
 Habesha (ሐበሻ ቢራ)
 Harar (ሐረር ቢራ)
 Walia (ዋልያ ቢራ)
 Raya (ራያ ቢራ)
 Balageru
 Azmera
 St. George Beer (ቅዱስ ጊዮርጊስ ቢራ)
 St. George Amber
 Zebedar Beer
 Heineken
 Castel
 Hakim Stout
 Garden Bräu Ebony
 Garden Bräu Blondy
Anbessa

Competition with home-brewed beers
As living standards increase, the richer segment of rural society frequently shifts from home-brewed beer to lager beer. Industrial breweries have seen this emerging market, and prepared specific brands, targeted at farmers: Balageru (meaning: the rural people) and Azmera beers (meaning: “good cropping season”).

See also

Beer in Africa
Beer by region

References 

 
Ethiopian cuisine